Fita (Ѳ ѳ; italics: Ѳ ѳ) is a letter of the Early Cyrillic alphabet. The shape and the name of the letter are derived from the Greek letter theta (Θ θ). In the ISO 9 system, Ѳ is romanized using F grave accent (F̀	f̀).

In the Cyrillic numeral system, Fita has a numerical value of 9.

Shape 
In traditional (Church Slavonic) typefaces, the central line is typically about twice the width of the letter's body and has serifs similar to those on the letter Т: . Sometimes the line is drawn as low as the baseline, which makes the letter difficult to distinguish from Д.

Usage

Old Russian and Church Slavonic
The traditional Russian name of the letter is  fitá (or, in pre-1918 spelling, ѳита́). Fita was mainly used to write proper names and loanwords derived from or via Greek.

Early texts in Russian (and in the Russian recension of Church Slavonic) demonstrate an increasing interchangeability of Ѳ and Ф. Some scribes preferred one of the two letters and ignored the other. There existed an orthographical system to write Ѳ in an initial position and Ф elsewhere. Since the middle of the 17th century, selection between Ѳ and Ф was re-adjusted to exactly follow the Greek origin, the system still in use in Church Slavonic orthography.

Russian
In the first variant of the Petrine Russian alphabet (1707–1708), the letter Ф was eliminated and Fita became the only way to represent . Later (1710) the letter Ф (with the same etymological rule of spelling Ѳ and Ф) was restored and both letters co-existed until the 1918 spelling reform, when Fita was eliminated and replaced by the letter Ef (Ф ф).

Note that many Greek words with Theta were adopted in Russian with Te (Т т) instead of Fita (mostly through Latin or other Western European languages): театръ (theatre), теорема (theorem), атлетъ (athlete), пантера (panther), фталевый (phthalic), etc. Sometimes dual spelling/pronunciation existed: аѳеизмъ/атеизмъ (atheism), алгориѳмъ/алгоритмъ (algorithm), каѳолическій/католическій (Catholic), etc.; the variants with Fita (in modern spelling with Ф) are typically more archaic or special.

Other languages
In other languages which use the Cyrillic alphabet, Fita was pronounced  and was replaced with Te (Т т). For example, the Bulgarian, Macedonian and Serbian version of Theodore is Тодор Todor or Теодор Teodor.

Romanian
Called thita,   is part of the Romanian Cyrillic alphabet, which was used until about 1860.

Aleut
Fita is used in the Cyrillic version of the Aleut alphabet, typically in loanwords.

Related letters and other similar characters
Θ θ/ : Greek letter Theta
Ө ө : Cyrillic letter Barred O, currently used in the Kazakh, Kyrgyz, Tuvan, and Mongolian languages

Computing codes

See also
 Th-fronting, pronunciation of English "th" as "f" or "v".
 Ҫ ҫ : Cyrillic letter the, which is pronounced in Bashkir as a voiceless dental fricative

References

External links
 

Cyrillic letters